Faces & Names is Dave Pirner's first solo studio album. It was released in the United States on 30 July 2002.

Track listing
All songs written by Dave Pirner.
"Teach Me To Breathe" – 3:46
"Never Recover" – 3:45
"Faces & Names" – 4:21
"Feel the Need" – 4:01
"Someday Love" – 3:49
"364" – 4:06
"I'll Have My Day" – 4:21
"Tea" – 3:33
"Much Too Easy" – 3:39
"Levitation" – 3:26
"Start Treating People Right" – 3:55

Personnel
Dave Pirner - vocals, guitar, trumpet
Pat Sansone - keyboards, guitar, backing vocals
Anthony Tidd - bass
Chris Joyner - organ, piano
Ian Mussington - drums, percussion, backing vocals
Sophia Jones - backing vocals
Oliver Leiber - guitar, bass, drums on "Teach Me to Breathe" and "Never Recover"
Mark Brown - bass on "Never Recover"
Billy Preston - organ, Wurlitzer on "Never Recover"
Chris Whitley - dobro on "Faces & Names" and "Start Treating People Right"
Brady Kish - double bass on "Faces & Names"
Kraig Jarret Johnson - guitar on "Someday Love"
Mike Napolitano - guitar on "Tea" and "Levitation"
Michael Blum - pedal steel on "Much Too Easy"
Eric "Skerik" Walton - tenor saxophone on "Levitation"

Singles 
"Tea"
"Levitation"
"Feel the Need"

References

2002 debut albums